Mappillai is a 2011 Indian Tamil-language action comedy film directed by Suraj, starring Dhanush as the son-in-law and Manisha Koirala as the mother-in-law along with actress Hansika Motwani (in her Tamil debut), playing as her daughter. The film is a reboot of the 1989 film of the same name, which itself was remake of Telugu film Attaku Yamudu Ammayiki Mogudu. Distributed by Sun Pictures, it was released on 8 April 2011. The film was a decent hit at the box office but received mixed reviews. It completed its 50 days of theatrical run. It was later dubbed into Hindi as Jamai Raja.

Plot
Saravanan is a do-gooder who is soft-spoken and admired by one and all. Another person named Child Chinna is the head of the Namitha Fan Club in his area. The two of them come across Gayathri, the daughter of an arrogant businesswoman named Rajeshwari. Chinna falls for Gayathri, so he tries several plans to get close to her, but in vain.

Gayathri falls for Saravanan after he saves her from an accident. Coming to know of their affair, Rajeshwari decides to have them marry. The reason is that she is keen on getting a son-in-law who will always do what she wants and be under her control.

However, Rajeshwari is in for a shock when she learns that Saravanan has a past. He is a much feared ruffian. Now she plans to halt all plans, while Saravanan overcomes her plans with ease. Rajeshwari takes steps to get her daughter Gayathri married to Devaraj's son Aathi. Saravanan challenges Rajeshwari to abduct the bride. But at a time when none of them expected the wedding, he kidnaps the groom. In the confusion of Devaraj rescuing his son, Saravanan defies Rajeshwari and ties the thaali around Gayathri's neck with her consent on the same stage in front of everyone. Later, Rajeshwari takes Saravanan to her house with his wife Gayathri. Rajeshwari tries not to let the two live together. But, Saravanan breaks it all and starts his married life with Gayathri.

At last, he learns that Rajeshwari had humiliated his parents when they ask her to accompany them to their village festival. He makes a plan to take her whole family to his village and make them stay there in his ancestral house with the help of Rajeshwari's astrologer, and further, he plans to arrange for his sister's marriage with Rajeshwari's son. Saravanan tricks Chinna to act a wealthy businessman named James Pandian, to which Chinna agrees. Later, Rajeshwari knows the truth about James. She insults him and his family in front of the whole village and leaves.

Later, she and Gayathri are caught by some goons, but Saravanan saves them and reconciles with his family.

Cast

 Dhanush as Saravanan
 Hansika Motwani as Gayathri
 Manisha Koirala as Rajeshwari
 Vivek as Child Chinna / James Pandiyan / Youth
 Pattimandram Raja as Saravanan's father
 Sriranjini as Saravanan's mother
 Dr. Sharmila as Saravanan's sister
 Ashish Vidyarthi as Devaraj
 Sathyan Sivakumar as Chinna's friend
 Thadi Balaji as Chinna's friend
 Cell Murugan as Chinna's friend
 Manobala as Rajeshwari's astrologer
 Chitti Babu as Rajeshwari's PA
 Madhan Bob as Rajeshwari's assistant
 Thyagu as Chinna's assistant
 Dhandapani as Industrialist
 Aryan as Aathi
 Vaiyapuri
 Vichu Vishwanath as Saravanan's brother-in-law
 Munnar Ramesh
 Maran as Ravi
 Jasper
 Baba Bhaskar (special appearance in the song "Onnu Rendu")
 Ramesh Thilak (uncredited role)

Reception

Critical response
Rohit Ramachandran of nowrunning.com gave it 3/5 stating that the film was Good entertaining with mixed comedy and action". Behindwoods.com gave 2.75 out of 5 giving the verdict "this Mappillai entertains in parts" and stating "Mapillai suffers from weak characterization but still how manages to keep entertain". Rediff gave 2.5 out of 5 describing it a "bad copy of the original", further adding that it was "just spice, humour, and plenty of silliness thrown in for good entertainment", while Sify stated that "it was a Romcom remake BUT Still requires some moments". Times of India gave 3 out of 5 and stated that "If you are among those for whom 'Mappillai' holds a lot of nostalgia, give the latest version a miss".

Box office
The film was said to have taken a good opening at the box office. At the Mayajaal multiplex on the ECR, the film had 50 shows per day and had collected a net of Rs 25.3 crore, in its opening weekend. Its three-week collection in Chennai was Rs. 41.2 crore with 56% occupancy at 100 theatres.

Soundtrack 

The soundtrack is scored by Mani Sharma. Audio was launched on 11 March 2011 at Kamarajar Arangam with Jayam Ravi and Bharath participating as guests, telecasted on Sun TV on 27 March 2011. The audio was marketed by Sony Music India.

The song Ennoda Raasi was recreated from the 1989 movie. The song "Onnu Rendu" was based on the song Suppanathi from the Telugu movie Dubai Seenu; and the songs "Ready Readya" and "Love Love" were based on the songs "Yelageyalaga" and "Manakanna Podiche'" (respectively) from the Telugu movie Parugu. Both Telugu movies were composed by Sharma.

References

External links

2011 masala films
Remakes of Indian films
Tamil remakes of Telugu films
2011 films
2010s Tamil-language films
Films scored by Mani Sharma